Suits is a 1999 American comedy film written and directed by Eric Weber and starring Robert Klein, Tony Hendra, Larry Pine.

Cast
Robert Klein...Tom Cranston
Tony Hendra...George Parkyn
Larry Pine...Peter Haverford
Paul Lazar...Mitchell Mitnick
Randy Pearlstein...Ken Tuttle
Frank Minucci...Robert Naylor Sr 
Edoardo Ballerini
Ingrid Rogers... Anita Tanner
James Villemaire...Doug Humphrey
Mark Lake...Harson Covington
Joelle Carter...	Heidi Wilson
Eben Moore...Rodney De Mole

Credits 
Written and directed by Eric Weber; director of photography Peter Nelson; edited by Nancy Novack; music by Pat Irwin; additional music by Air Supply; produced by Chris Giordano; Released by Tenafly Film Company.

References

1999 films
1999 comedy films